Kristian Jensen (born January 22, 1996) is a Danish professional ice hockey player. He is currently playing with Frederikshavn White Hawks of the Metal Ligaen.

Jensen made his Swedish Hockey League debut playing with Luleå HF during the 2014–15 SHL season.

References

External links

1996 births
Living people
Luleå HF players
Odense Bulldogs players
Piteå HC players
SønderjyskE Ishockey players
Swedish ice hockey forwards
Sportspeople from Odense